Crossocalyx is a genus of liverworts belonging to the family Anastrophyllaceae.

The species of this genus are found in Eurasia and Northern America.

Species:
 Crossocalyx hellerianus (Nees ex Lindenb.) Meyl. 
 Crossocalyx koriakensis Schljakov

References

Jungermanniales
Jungermanniales genera